Scuticaria salesiana is a species of orchid ranging from southeastern Ecuador to Peru.

References 

salesiana